Count of La Conquista is an 18th-century Spanish hereditary title, famously held by Mateo de Toro Zambrano y Ureta, who was Royal Governor of Chile as well as President of the Government Junta of the Kingdom of Chile, which is generally seen as the first step of Chilean independence.

The title was created by King Charles III in 1770, based on Chilean estates to be inherited by primogeniture but was extinguished with the abolition of the nobility titles by the Chilean government after the Independence of that country from Spain. On March 5, 1857 it was revived by Queen Isabella II for the heir of the last holder.

Counts of La Conquista
Mateo de Toro-Zambrano y Ureta, 1st Count of La Conquista (1727–1811)
Gregorio José de Toro-Zambrano y Valdés, 2nd Count of La Conquista (1758–1816)
Manuel María de Toro-Zambrano y Dumont de Holdre, 3rd Count of La Conquista (1798–1818)
María Nicolasa Isidora de las Mercedes de Toro-Zambrano y Dumont de Holdre, 4th Countess of La Conquista
Rafael Correa de Saa y Toro-Zambrano, legitimate heir to the County of La Conquista (1824–1888)
María Nicolasa Correa de Saa y Blanco, legitimate heiress to the County of La Conquista (1852–1909)
Julio Prado y Colón de Carvajal, 5th Count of La Conquista
Julio Manuel de Prado y Díez, 6th Count of La Conquista

Sources
Genealogical chart of family 
1940s Succession 

Conquista
Lists of counts
Conquista
1770s establishments in the Captaincy General of Chile
1770 establishments in the Spanish Empire